Derek Malcolm Craig is an English footballer who made nearly 250 appearances in the Football League playing as a central defender for Newcastle United, San Jose Earthquakes, Darlington, York City and Brandon United. He also played in the North American Soccer League for the San Jose Earthquakes and in non-league football for Brandon United.

As a youngster he played for Clara Vale in the 1960s. He made his professional debut with Newcastle United during the 1971–72 season.

References

1952 births
Living people
People from Ryton, Tyne and Wear
Footballers from Tyne and Wear
Footballers from County Durham
English footballers
Association football defenders
Newcastle United F.C. players
San Jose Earthquakes (1974–1988) players
Darlington F.C. players
York City F.C. players
Brandon United F.C. players
English Football League players
North American Soccer League (1968–1984) players
English expatriate sportspeople in the United States
Expatriate soccer players in the United States
English expatriate footballers